Common Goal is the third album by American jazz group the String Trio of New York recorded in 1981 for the Italian Black Saint label.

Reception
The Allmusic review awarded the album 4 stars.

Track listing
 "Multiple Reasons" (John Lindberg) - 7:06
 "Space Walk"(Billy Bang) - 7:50
 "San San Nana" (Bang) - 5:50
 "Between the Lines" (James Emery) - 6:56
 "Common Goal" (Lindberg) - 6:04
 "Extensions and Exceptions" (Emery) - 7:32
Recorded at Barigozzi Studio in Milano, Italy on November 12 & 13, 1981

Personnel
Billy Bang - violin, yokobue flute, gong
James Emery - guitar
John Lindberg - bass

References

Black Saint/Soul Note albums
String Trio of New York albums
1981 albums